Darren Haas (born 1974) is an American software engineer and executive at General Electric, where he heads the Engineering group at GE Digital. He is a co-founder of Change.org and was a principal engineer at Siri, acquired by Apple.

Education 
Haas received as B.S. in Software Engineering from California State University, Chico.

Career in software engineering 
Before joining General Electric, Haas led a team that developed the cloud platform at Apple. Haas came to Apple by way of its acquisition of Siri, where he built early prototypes of the NLP engine and was co-founder of the Siri architectural platform. There he wrote the first prototype of Siri. During his tenure at Apple he co-founded Change.org.

Popular Children's Application

In 2010, Haas wrote and released an IPhone application based on the popular book Flat Stanley. By 2019, the application had over 1 million downloads.

Personal life 

Haas is married and has four children.

Awards and honors 
 Outlier Award (2018)

References

External links 
 

Living people
Open source advocates
California State University, Chico alumni
1974 births